Hendanes Lighthouse is a coastal lighthouse located in Kinn Municipality in Vestland county, Norway.

History
It was first lit in 1914 and it was replaced by an automated light in 1952. A radio beacon was active from 1963 to 1992.

The octagonal wood tower and adjacent lighthouse keeper's home are built into the side of a mountain. The tower is painted white and the lantern is red. The light emits a white, red or green light, depending on direction, occulting twice every 8 seconds.

See also

 List of lighthouses in Norway
 Lighthouses in Norway

References

External links
 Norsk Fyrhistorisk Forening 

Lighthouses completed in 1914
Lighthouses in Vestland
Kinn